Louis Urgel (23 September 1857 – 17 August 1942) was the male name under which Louise Legru, née L'Henoret, published her musical compositions. She was one of the few French female composers of light music in the 1920s. Her Vieux Garçons! was first performed in Paris at the Théâtre de la Gaîte-Lyrique on February 21, 1931. 

She was married to Hector Legru.

Works 
Selected works include:

 1911: Aux petits Enfants, poem by Alphonse Daudet.
 1920: Les Chagrins, for singing and piano.
 1922: Monsieur Dumollet, three-act operetta, libretto by Victor Jannet, lyrics by Hugues Delorme
 1923: Amour de princesse, three-act operetta, libretto by Victor Jeannet and Hugues Delorme
 1925: Qu'en dit l'abbé?, opérette galante in three acts, libretto by Jacques Battaille-Henri
 1928: Une nuit au Louvre, three-act operetta, libretto by Henri Duvernois, lyrics by René Dorin
 1931: Vieux Garçons, conducted by Jules Gressier

References

External links 
 Louis Urgel on data.bnf.fr
 

Date of birth unknown
1942 deaths
French women classical composers
Women opera composers
French operetta composers
Light music composers
Musicians from Paris
Burials at Père Lachaise Cemetery